The Vancouver Whitecaps FC women was a Canadian soccer club based in Vancouver, British Columbia that played in the USL W-League, the second tier of women's soccer in the United States and Canada. The team was formed in 2001 under the name Vancouver Breakers following a merger of the Vancouver Lady 86ers and Vancouver Angels. In 2003, they changed their name to the Whitecaps to match the men's team.

History

Pre-formation

Vancouver Lady 86ers
In 2000, the Vancouver Lady 86ers played an exhibition season over the summer along with three other new Pacific Northwest teams: Portland Rain, Spokane Chill and the Seattle Sounders Select Women, with the four teams planning to join the USL W-League for the 2001 season.

Vancouver Angels

In 2000, the Vancouver Angels were established to play in the Women's Premier Soccer League. During the 2000 season, the Angels finished in fourth place in the eight team division.

Breakers years

In 2001, David Stadnyk, the owner of the Angels, purchased the Vancouver 86ers and merged the Angels with the Lady 86ers under the name Vancouver Breakers, while renaming the male 86ers to their former name Vancouver Whitecaps The team joined the USL W-League for the 2001 season. 

In their debut season, they finished first in the Western Conference advancing to the playoffs. In the semi-finals, the Breakers needed a 104th minute overtime golden goal from Andrea Neil to advance on a 1–0 win over the host Hampton Road Piranhas. After a two-and-a-half hour thunderstorm delay that resulted in the cancellation of the 3rd place game, the championship final was played at the Virginia Beach Sportsplex. When the skies cleared, despite a goal from Vancouver’s Tammy Crawford, the Breakers were defeated 5-1 by the Boston Renegades.

In 2002, the Breakers had another strong season, losing only one match (in overtime) during the regular season. However, in the playoffs, they lost in the semi-finals to the Charlotte Lady Eagles on penalty kicks. After the 2002 season, following a complaint from the WUSA's Boston Breakers, the Whitecaps held a contest to determine a new club name.

Whitecaps years

In 2003, both the men's and women's teams were purchased by Greg Kerfoot and the Breakers were renamed as the Whitecaps to consolidate the men's, women's, and youth teams under a single name. The team won the 2004 and 2006 championships, and was runner-up in 2001 and 2010. Vancouver played in the Western Conference against the Colorado Force, Colorado Rush, LA Strikers, Pali Blues, Santa Clarita Blue Heat, Seattle Sounders Women and Victoria Highlanders Women.

In 2011, the women played each home game in a different city in British Columbia. The team's colours were blue and white.

The club announced that it will not field a team for the 2013 USL W-League season. They stated it was because many of the best players in Canada are going to play in the National Women's Soccer League, involving the US Soccer Federation, Canadian Soccer Association, and Mexican Football Federation. The Whitecaps continued fielding an under-18 team, their girls elite program, in the 2013 Pacific Coast Soccer League.

REX Program

In 2015, in collarboration with BC Soccer and the Canadian Soccer Association, the Whitecaps launched the first Women's Regional EXCEL Centre (REX) in Western Canada, for top Canadian women soccer prospects.

Former head coaches

Seasons 
as Vancouver Breakers

as Vancouver Whitecaps Women

Top Goalscorers

Awards and honours 

 USL W-League Champions: 2004, 2006
 USL W-League Western Conference Champions: 2001, 2002, 2003, 2004, 2005, 2006, 2010

Notable players 

Famous Players

 ''See also List of Vancouver Whitecaps Women players

References

External links 

 Vancouver Whitecaps FC Women's Program
  Vancouver Whitecaps FC Women on USL Soccer
  2011 Year in Review

 
Women
Women's soccer clubs in Canada
United Soccer League teams based in Canada
USL W-League (1995–2015) teams
2001 establishments in British Columbia